Yegheg is a village in the Kapan Municipality of the Syunik Province in Armenia.

Etymology 
The village was previously known as Shabadin.

Demographics 
The National Statistical Service of the Republic of Armenia (ARMSTAT) reported its population as 113 in 2010, down from 166 at the 2001 census.

References 

Populated places in Syunik Province